Mikron Group, headed by JSC Mikron, is a  manufacturer and exporter of microelectronics in Russia and the CIS. Its facilities are located in Zelenograd, Russia.

History 
During the period from 1960–1980 Mikron developed microelectronic technologies for the USSR. 

The company collaborated with STMicroelectronics to establish a 180 nm process in 2007, with plans to begin mass production the next year.

In 2010, Mikron obtained a license for a 90 nm process, with production starting around 2012–2013. The 90 nm production facilities and the design center were co-financed almost up to 50% by Rusnano, with a total cost of 16,57 billion Russian rubles. 

In 2014, due to the suspension of activities between Visa, MasterCard and certain Russian banks, Mikron hoped to receive orders related to the creation of the Russian national card payment system to be launched in 2015. 

In late 2014 it was announced that Mikron had started pilot production of a domestic microprocessor called Elbrus-2SM using a 90 nm process under the import substitution program in Russia. Domestic production of the Elbrus-2SM microprocessor was selected by the readers of the technical magazine CNews as the most significant event of 2014, while the creation of a national card payment system ranked at number 3 on the list. The 65 nm process was also accomplished in the following years and passes qualification and refinement of the production process in 2020.

In April 2022, the US Treasury Department imposed sanctions on 21 entities and 13 people, including Mikron, for their ties to Russia following Russia's invasion of Ukraine.

In May 2022, MCST started talks with Mikron to move production of the Elbrus processors to Mikron's facilities, after Taiwan's TSMC cut off its ties with the Russian company due to US sanctions. The transfer of production would require MCST to switch back to a 90 nm process, as Mikron does not provide production using 28 nm technology.

Products 
 589 series bit-slice processor (equivalent to Intel 3000)
 1891 series CPU (Elbrus 2000 instruction set; designed by MCST)
Elbrus-8SV(CPU CHIP PRODUCTION NUMBER：1891VM12Ya) CPU (Elbrus-8S reverse engineering set; copied by MCST).   
 1892 series CPUs (MIPS32 instruction set; designed by ELVEES Multicore)
 1907 series CPUs (MIPS32 instruction set, designed by the Scientific Research Institute of System Development)
 K5500VK018 CPUs (MIPS IV instruction set, designed by the Scientific Research Institute of System Development).

Gallery

See also
 Soviet integrated circuit designation

References

External links 
 Official website in Russian, more frequent news update
 Mikron Product Catalog in English - Micron provides contract manufacturing services according to technological
standards from 90 nm to 65 nm with a focus on the following technologies．
 

Semiconductor companies of Russia
Manufacturing companies based in Moscow
RTI Systems
Zelenograd
Electronics companies of the Soviet Union
Ministry of the Electronics Industry (Soviet Union)
Electronics companies of Russia